The 1868 United Kingdom general election in Ireland resulted in the Liberals under Gladstone strengthening their control over Ireland, particularly the south. It was the first election following the Representation of the People (Ireland) Act 1868.

A key focus of the Liberal campaign was on their proposal to disestablish the Church of Ireland. The Church of Ireland's official role, as the Protestant national church of a Catholic majority country, had long proved controversial. The Tithe War of the 1830s had largely resulted in the abolition of tithes, which had been levied on Ireland's population (both Protestants and Catholics) to fund the Church of Ireland. Disestablishment was popular both in Ireland, and also amongst non-conformists and the Irish diaspora in Britain, particularly in the Celtic Fringe. This policy would be enacted following the election by the Irish Church Act 1869.

The election marked the high-water point of the Liberals in Ireland, and within 17 years they would have no seats at all in Ireland.

Results

The results from Dublin University, which returned two Conservatives to parliament, is not included in the vote total.

Following election petitions in Cashel, won by the Liberal Party, and Sligo, won by the Conservative Party, the MPs were unseated. Under the Sligo and Cashel Disfranchisement Act 1870, both boroughs lost their right to elect MPs.

See also
 History of Ireland (1801–1923)

References

1874
Ireland
November 1868 events
December 1868 events
1868 elections in Ireland